Nyzhni Vorota (by 1945 the village had the name  ) is a village in Volovets Raion, Zakarpattia Oblast of Western Ukraine.
The village has around 2,504 inhabitants. Local government is administered by Nyzhnovoritska village council, based in the village.

Geography
The village Nyzhni Vorota is located in the Carpathian Mountains, on the southern slopes of the Dividing Range, within Volovets Pass.
Through the village passes the Highway M06 (Ukraine). It is a Ukrainian international highway (M-highway) connecting Kyiv to the Hungarian border near Chop, where it connects to the Hungarian Highway .

History

By 1880, the Jewish population was 545 (of a total population of 1,276). With the Hungarian occupation in March, 1939, Jews were persecuted and pushed out of their occupations. In 1941, dozens of Jews from Nyzhni Vorota were drafted into forced labor battalions and others were drafted for service on the Eastern front, where most died. In August, 1941, a number of Jewish families (totaling 80 persons) without Hungarian citizenship were expelled to Nazi occupied Ukrainian territory, to Kamenets-Podolski, and murdered there. The remaining Jews, about 500, were deported to Auschwitz mid-May 1944.

References

External links
 weather.in.ua/Nyzhni Vorota (Zakarpattia (Transcarpathian) region)
 Nyzhni Vorota: Ukraine

See also
Veretzky (Rabbinical dynasty)

Villages in Mukachevo Raion
Holocaust locations in Ukraine